Montrouge is a commune in the southern Parisian suburbs, located  from the centre of Paris. It is one of the most densely populated municipalities in Europe. After a long period of decline, the population has increased again in recent years.

History
The name "Montrouge" means Red Mountain - from mont (mountain) and rouge (red) - because of the reddish colour of the earth in this area.

The name of the community was first mentioned in monastery documents in 1194.

Throughout the Middle Ages, the hamlet was home to monasteries and a number of religious orders, while in the 15th century it became the site of quarries used for the reconstruction of Paris. The late sixteenth century saw the plain of Montrouge named "reserve for royal hunts", and during the seventeenth and eighteenth centuries it was known for its windmills, which have all now disappeared.

On 1 January 1860, the city of Paris was enlarged by annexing neighbouring communes. On that occasion, most of the commune of Montrouge was annexed to Paris, forming what is now called Petit-Montrouge, in the 14th arrondissement of Paris. The remainder of Montrouge was preserved as an independent town.

In 1875, the town gained a few thousand square metres from the neighbouring communes of Châtillon and Bagneux (principally in the neighbourhood (le quartier) called Haut Mesnil).

On 8 January 2015, Municipal Police officer Clarissa Jean-Philippe was shot and killed in the commune, purportedly by Amedy Coulibaly. Coulibaly was reported to be an accomplice of Saïd and Chérif Kouachi, the suspected perpetrators of the Charlie Hebdo shooting. The next day, he was gunned down by police during a siege that left four hostages dead and several other people injured.

Population

Economy

Industrial development started in 1925 and soon, many printing factories were to be found in the town.  Most of these have disappeared today. Since the early years of the twenty-first century, professional services and telecommunications have been the main business activities.

 Aeronautical and electronic engineering, Alstom, Schlumberger, Siemens AG, ST Microelectronics
 Banking, Credit Agricole Corporate and Investment Bank
 Telecommunications, Orange
 The Papier d'Arménie (lit. Armenian Paper)

Public transport

Montrouge is served by Mairie de Montrouge and Barbara stations on Paris Métro Line 4, and by Châtillon – Montrouge station on Paris Métro Line 13.

The Châtillon - Montrouge station is located at the border between the commune of Montrouge and the commune of Châtillon, on the Châtillon side of the border. The Barbara station is located at the border between the commune of Montrouge and the commune of Bagneux. The Mairie de Montrouge station opened in March 2013, with the further extension of Line 4 opening to Bagneux–Lucie Aubrac in January 2022.

Bus line 68 runs from Metro Châtillon Montrouge all the way up through Montparnasse, the Louvre, the Paris Opera and ends at the Place de Clichy, the site of the Moulin Rouge. Bus line 126 runs from Porte d'Orléans to Boulogne-Billancourt, while line 128 goes from the same place to Robinson RER station. Bus line 323 runs on the southern border of Montrouge on its way between Issy-les-Moulineaux and Ivry-sur-Seine. Several lines (187, 188, 197, 297) use the Route nationale 20 that crosses eastern Montrouge to reach southern parts of the Parisian agglomeration.

The Arts in Montrouge
Montrouge was the home of a number of well-known twentieth century artists, listed below.  Currently the town is also well known for two contemporary art exhibitions:
The Montrouge Contemporary Art Show, which has existed for over 50 years
The JCE, that is European Young Artists exhibition.

Education
Montrouge has seven public primary schools: Aristide Briand, Buffalo, François Rabelais, Nicolas Boileau, Raymond Queneau, Renaudel A, and Renaudel B.

Public junior high schools: Haut Mesnil, Maurice Genevoix, Robert Doisneau.

Public high schools: Lycée Jean Monnet, Lycée Maurice Genevoix.

There is a private secondary school, Groupe Scolaire du Haut-Mesnil.

Notable people 

 Émile Boutroux (1845–1921), philosopher and member of the Académie française
 Robert Brasillach (1909–1945) French author and journalist.
 Émile Chatelain (1851–1933), Latinist and palaeographer
 Coluche (b. 1944 in Paris–1986) (Michel Collucci), comedian and sometime political figure, founder of the "Restos du cœur" soup kitchens.
 Robert Doisneau (1912–1994), photographer, born in Gentilly, lived in Montrouge from 1937 until his death.
 Raymond Federman (1928-2009) American novelist and academic.
 Jean-Jacques Goldman (b. 1951), lyricist and singer, he has lived most of his life in Montrouge, but now resides in Marseille.
 William Grover-Williams (1903–1945), racing driver and Special Operations Executive agent.
 Octave Lapize (1887–1917), winner of the 1910 Tour de France
 Fernand Léger (1881-1955) lived in Montrouge and ran a painting school there.
 Pablo Picasso (1881–1973), the cubist, had his workshop in Montrouge from 1916 to 1918.
 Bernard Pivot (b. 1935), journalist and television personality. Born in Lyon, Mr. Pivot has lived in Montrouge since 2003.
 Claude Sautet (1924–2000), director and screenwriter.
 Nicolas de Staël (1914–55) is buried in Montrouge Cemetery.

Personalities associated with the commune 
 Amaury-Duval (1808-1885) a student of Ingres including Portrait d'Isaure Chassériau in 1838
 Harry Baur, Montrouge 1880 – Paris 1943, actor
 Edouard Boubat, (1923-30 June 1999 in Montrouge), photographer
 Alexandre Boutique (1851-1923), novelist
 Émile Boutroux (1845-1921), philosopher and member of the Académie française.
 Gérard Brach (23 July 1927 in Montrouge - 9 September 2006 in Paris), screenwriter
 Jean-Roger Caussimon 24 July 1918 in Montrouge -  20 October 1985 in Paris, actor, poet, and libertarian songwriter.
 Pierre Collet (1914  Montrouge, 1977 in Paris), actor
 Pierre Colombier, film director,  died 25 January 1958.
 Michel Colucci (Coluche) (1944-1986), humorist. Born in Paris, spent his youth in the city.
 Jean-Claude Deret (1921-), né Breitman, author, screenwriter, actor, director
 Robert Doisneau (1912-1994), photographer. Born in Gentilly, settled in Montrouge in 1937
 Jacques Dynam (30 December 1923 in Montrouge -  11 November 2004 in Paris), real name Jacques Barbé, actor
 Raymond Federman (1928-2009), American writer, born in Montrouge
 Carole Gaessler, journalist for France 2 and France 5
 Théophile Gautier is supposed to have lived on avenue Verdier
 Jean Giraud (Moebius) (1938-2012), cartoonist and scenarist
 Jean-Jacques Goldman, (1951- ), songwriter and singer. Born in Paris, lives now in Marseille
 Piotr Kowalski (1927-2004)
 Octave Lapize (1887-1917), cyclist
 Virginie Ledoyen, actress living in Montrouge since 2003
 René Metge, (23 October 1941 in Montrouge
 Ariane Mnouchkine, theatre director, lives in Montrouge.
 Pablo Picasso (1881-1973), lived at 22 rue Victor Hugo in 1916
 Jules Pillevesse (1837–1903), composer and conductor died in the commune
 Bernard Pivot (1935-), journalist. Born in Lyon, lived in the city from 2003 to 2007.
 Raoul Pugno (1852-1914), born in Montrouge, composer and pianist
 François Roy, actor and film score composer
 Claude Sautet (1924-2000), screenwriter and film director born in Montrouge
 Évelyne Sullerot (1924-2017), famous for her feminist militantism
 Valentine Tessier (1892- 1981), actress, spent her youth in Montrouge
 Atiq Rahimi, prix Goncourt 2008, lives in Montrouge

Others
Fort de Montrouge, one of the 16 forts built around Paris in the 1840s, located mainly in the commune of Arcueil.

See also
Communes of the Hauts-de-Seine department

References

External links

Montrouge official website 

 
Communes of Hauts-de-Seine